The 2021 Oklahoma State Cowboys baseball team will represent Oklahoma State University during the 2021 NCAA Division I baseball season. The Cowboys play their home games at O'Brate Stadium as a member of the Big 12 Conference. They are led by head coach Josh Holliday, in his 9th season at Oklahoma State.

This will be the program's first season at O'Brate Stadium, after the 2020 season was canceled prior to the opening game at the ballpark due to the COVID-19 pandemic.

Previous season

The 2020 Oklahoma State Cowboys baseball team notched a 13–5 record in February and early March; however, the remainder of the season was abruptly halted on March 13, 2020, when the Big 12 Conference canceled the remainder of the athletics season due to the Coronavirus pandemic.

Personnel

Coaching Staff

Roster

Schedule and results

! style="background:#FF6600;color:white;"| Regular Season (32–16–1)
|- valign="top"

|- align="center" bgcolor="lightgrey"
| February 19 || 6:30 pm || ESPN+ || at Sam Houston State* || #20 || Don Sanders StadiumHuntsville, TX ||  ||  ||  ||  ||  ||  || — || Story
|- align="center" bgcolor="lightgrey"
| February 20 || 3:00 pm ||  || at Sam Houston State* || #20 || Don Sanders StadiumHuntsville, TX ||  ||  ||  ||  ||  ||  || — || Story
|- align="center" bgcolor="lightgrey"
| February 21 || 1:00 pm || BSN || at Sam Houston State* || #20 || Don Sanders StadiumHuntsville, TX ||  ||  ||  ||  ||  ||  || — || Story
|- bgcolor="#bbffbb"
| February 21 || 2:00 pm ||  || at * || #20 || Eck StadiumWichita, KS || W3–1 || Scott(1–0) || Eddy(0–1) || Standlee(1)  || 1,447 || 1–0–0 || — || StatsStory
|- bgcolor="#bbffbb"
| February 22 || 2:00 pm ||  || at Wichita State* || #20 || Eck StadiumWichita, KS || W14–6  || Martin(1–0) || Hynes(0–1) || — || 1,468 || 2–0–0 || — || StatsStory
|- bgcolor="#bbffbb"
| February 24 || 4:00 pm || ESPN+ || Little Rock* || #20 || O'Brate StadiumStillwater, OK || W7–2 || Cheney(1–0) || McKnight(0–1) || — || 2,635 || 3–0–0 || — || StatsStory
|- bgcolor="#bbffbb"
| February 26 || 4:00 pm || ESPN+ || * || #20 || O'Brate StadiumStillwater, OK || W3–2 || Standlee(1–0) || Salata(0–1) || — || 2,412 || 4–0–0 || — || StatsStory
|- bgcolor="#bbffbb"
| February 27 || 4:00 pm || ESPN+ || Illinois State* || #20 || O'Brate StadiumStillwater, OK || W8–2 || Scott(2–0) || Sinisko(0–1) || — || 2,507 || 5–0–0 || — || StatsStory
|- bgcolor="#bbffbb"
| February 28 || 1:00 pm ||  || Illinois State* || #20 || O'Brate StadiumStillwater, OK || W6–0 || Osmond(1–0) || Anderson(0–1) || — || 2,413 || 6–0–0 || — || StatsStory
|-

|- bgcolor="#bbffbb"
| March 2 || 3:00 pm || ESPN+ || at * || #15 || Hammons FieldSpringfield, MO || W7–0 || Campbell(1–0) || Buckner(1–1) || — || 605 || 7–0–0 || — || StatsStory
|- bgcolor="#bbffbb"
| March 5 || 4:00 pm ||  || * || #15 || O'Brate StadiumStillwater, OK || W11–5 || Scott(3–0) || Barnes(1–2) || — || 2,439 || 8–0–0 || — || StatsStory
|- bgcolor="#bbffbb"
| March 6 || 4:00 pm ||  || Grand Canyon* || #15 || O'Brate StadiumStillwater, OK || W3–0 || Wrobleski(1–0) || Ohl(1–1) || Standlee(2) || 3,105 || 9–0–0 || — || StatsStory
|- bgcolor="#FDFD96"
| March 7 || 12:00 pm ||  || Grand Canyon* || #15 || O'Brate StadiumStillwater, OK || T4–4 || — || — || — || 2,685 || 9–0–1 || — || StatsStory
|- bgcolor="#bbffbb"
| March 9 || 6:00 pm || ORUSN || at * || #13 || J. L. Johnson StadiumTulsa, OK || W5–0 || Campbell(2–0) || Davis(0–3) || — || 969 || 10–0–1 || — || StatsStory
|- bgcolor="#ffbbbb"
| March 13 || 1:00 pm || ESPN+ || #2 Vanderbilt* || #13 || O'Brate StadiumStillwater, OK || L0–5 || Rocker(4–0) || Scott(3–1) || — || 3,480 || 10–1–1 || — || StatsStory
|- bgcolor="#ffbbbb"
| March 13 || 6:00 pm || ESPN+ || #2 Vanderbilt* || #13 || O'Brate StadiumStillwater, OK || L4–18 || Leiter(4–0) || Wrobleski(1–1) || — || 3,480 || 10–2–1 || — || StatsStory
|- bgcolor="#bbffbb"
| March 14 || 1:00 pm || ESPN+ || #2 Vanderbilt* || #13 || O'Brate StadiumStillwater, OK || W10–6 || Osmond(2–0) || Schultz(1–2) || — || 3,296 || 11–2–1 || — || StatsStory
|- bgcolor="#ffbbbb"
| March 16 || 6:00 pm || FloSports || vs. UL Monroe* || #14 || Globe Life FieldArlington, TX || L6–13 || Judice(1–0) || Walker(0–1) || — || 405 || 11–3–1 || — || StatsStory
|- bgcolor="#bbffbb"
| March 19 || 6:30 pm || ESPN+ || at #7 Texas Tech || #14 || Dan Law FieldLubbock, TX || W2–0 || Scott(4–1) || Birdsell(2–1) || Standlee(3) || 4,432 || 12–3–1 || 1–0–0 || StatsStory
|- bgcolor="#ffbbbb"
| March 20 || 2:00 pm || ESPN+ || at #7 Texas Tech || #14 || Dan Law FieldLubbock, TX || L2–4 || Monteverde(4–0) || Wrobleski(1–2) || Dallas(1) || 4,432 || 12–4–1 || 1–1–0 || StatsStory
|- bgcolor="#ffbbbb"
| March 21 || 2:00 pm || ESPN+ || at #7 Texas Tech || #14 || Dan Law FieldLubbock, TX || L5–6 || Sublette(3–0) || Osmond(2–1) || Bridges(1) || 3,733 || 12–5–1 || 1–2–0 || StatsStory
|- bgcolor="#ffbbbb"
| March 23 || 6:00 pm || ESPN+ || Missouri State* || #20 || O'Brate StadiumStillwater, OK || L8–11 || Ziegenbein(2–0) || Kelly(0–1) || Juenger(1) || 2,466 || 12–6–1 || — || StatsStory
|- bgcolor="#bbffbb"
| March 26 || 6:00 pm || ESPN+ || Kansas State || #20 || O'Brate StadiumStillwater, OK || W14–5 || Scott(5–1) || Wicks(4–1) || — || 3,383 || 13–6–1 || 2–2–0 || StatsStory
|- bgcolor="#bbffbb"
| March 27 || 6:00 pm ||  || Kansas State || #20 || O'Brate StadiumStillwater, OK || W4–2 || Standlee(2–0) || Littlejim(1–2) || — || 3,846 || 14–6–1 || 3–2–0 || StatsStory
|- bgcolor="#bbffbb"
| March 28 || 1:00 pm || ESPN+ || Kansas State || #20 || O'Brate StadiumStillwater, OK || W8–2 || Wrobleski(2–2) || McCullough(1–1) || — || 3,203 || 15–6–1 || 4–2–0 || StatsStory
|- bgcolor="#bbffbb"
| March 30 || 6:00 pm || ESPN+ || * || #16 || O'Brate StadiumStillwater, OK || W5–4 || Standlee(3–0) || Taggart(0–3) || — || 3,559 || 16–6–1 || — || StatsStory
|-

|- bgcolor="#ffbbbb"
| April 1 || 6:00 pm || ESPN+ ||  || #16 || O'Brate StadiumStillwater, OK || L3–4 || Wolf(3–2) || Osmond(2–2) || Watters(2) || 2,751 || 16–7–1 || 4–3–0 || StatsStory
|- bgcolor="#bbffbb"
| April 2 || 6:00 pm ||  || West Virginia || #16 || O'Brate StadiumStillwater, OK || W7–2 || Campbell(3–0) || Tulloch(0–2) || — || 2,850 || 17–7–1 || 5–3–0 || StatsStory
|- bgcolor="#bbffbb"
| April 3 || 1:00 pm || ESPN+ || West Virginia || #16 || O'Brate StadiumStillwater, OK || W21–11(8) || Martin(2–0) || Reed(1–2) || — || 3,147 || 18–7–1 || 6–3–0 || StatsStory
|- bgcolor="#bbffbb"
| April 10 || 1:00 pm ||  || * || #14 || O'Brate StadiumStillwater, OK || W7–6 || Scott(6–1) || Roupp(3–3) || — || 2,912 || 19–7–1 || — || StatsStory
|- bgcolor="#bbffbb"
| April 10 || 6:00 pm || ESPN+ || UNC Wilmington* || #14 || O'Brate StadiumStillwater, OK || W10–3 || Campbell(4–0) || Gesell(2–3) || Davis(1) || 4,869 || 20–7–1 || — || StatsStory
|- bgcolor="#bbffbb"
| April 11 || 2:00 pm ||  || UNC Wilmington* || #14 || O'Brate StadiumStillwater, OK || W10–4 || Wrobleski(3–2) || Calvert(1–1) || — || 3,154 || 21–7–1 || — || StatsStory
|- align="center" bgcolor="lightgrey"
| April 13 || 6:00 pm || ESPN+ || Oral Roberts* || #13 || O'Brate StadiumStillwater, OK ||  ||  ||  ||  ||  ||  || — || Story
|- bgcolor="#ffbbbb"
| April 16 || 6:30 pm || ESPN+ || at #12 TCU || #13 || Lupton StadiumFort Worth, TX || L8–9 || King(4–1) || Davis(0–1) || Green(8) || 2,218 || 21–8–1 || 6–4–0 || StatsStory
|- bgcolor="#ffbbbb"
| April 17 || 2:00 pm || ESPN+ || at #12 TCU || #13 || Lupton StadiumFort Worth, TX || L7–8 || Ridings(2–1) || Standlee(3–1) || — || 2,736 || 21–9–1 || 6–5–0 || StatsStory
|- bgcolor="#ffbbbb"
| April 18 || 1:00 pm || ESPN+ || at #12 TCU || #13 || Lupton StadiumFort Worth, TX || L6–12 || King(5–1) || McLean(0–1) || — || 2,589 || 21–10–1 || 6–6–0 || StatsStory
|- bgcolor="#bbffbb"
| April 20 || 6:00 pm ||  || * ||  || O'Brate StadiumStillwater, OK || W28–0(7) || Varela(1–0) || Horn Jr.(1–3) || — || 2,100 || 22–10–1 || — || StatsStory
|- bgcolor="#bbffbb"
| April 21 || 6:00 pm ||  || * ||  || O'Brate StadiumStillwater, OK || W12–2(7) || Cable(1–0) || Rieschick(1–1) || — || 2,160 || 23–10–1 || — || StatsStory
|- bgcolor="#ffbbbb"
| April 24 || 2:00 pm ||  || #3 Texas || #24 || O'Brate StadiumStillwater, OK || L3–4 || Madden(6–1) || Osmond(2–3) || Nixon(4) || 4,258 || 23–11–1 || 6–7–0 || StatsStory
|- bgcolor="#ffbbbb"
| April 24 || 6:00 pm || ESPN+ || #3 Texas || #24 || O'Brate StadiumStillwater, OK || L2–5 || Stevens(7–1) || Campbell(4–1) || Witt(3) || 4,258 || 23–12–1 || 6–8–0 || StatsStory
|- bgcolor="#bbffbb"
| April 25 || 1:00 pm || ESPN+ || #3 Texas || #24 || O'Brate StadiumStillwater, OK || W7–3 || Standlee(4–1) || Kubichek(5–3) || — || 3,306 || 24–12–1 || 7–8–0 || StatsStory
|- bgcolor="#ffbbbb"
| April 30 || 6:00 pm || ESPN+ || Oklahoma ||  || O'Brate StadiumStillwater, OK || L2–16 || Olds(3–4) || Osmond(2–4) || — || 3,830 || 24–13–1 || 7–9–0 || StatsStory
|-

|- bgcolor="#ffbbbb"
| May 1 || 3:00 pm || BSOK || at Oklahoma ||  || Mitchell ParkNorman, OK || L3–5 || Ruffcorn(4–1) || Davis(0–2) || — || 1,375 || 24–14–1 || 7–10–0 || StatsStory
|- bgcolor="#bbffbb"
| May 2 || 4:00 pm || ESPNU || at Oklahoma ||  || Mitchell ParkNorman, OK || W8–7(12) || Davis(1–2) || Godman(0–2) || — || 1,276 || 25–14–1 || 8–10–0 || StatsStory
|- bgcolor="#bbffbb"
| May 7 || 6:00 pm || ESPN+ || at  ||  || Hoglund BallparkLawrence, KS || W13–4 || Stone(1–0) || Larsen(4–5) || — || 481 || 26–14–1 || 9–10–0 || StatsStory
|- bgcolor="#bbffbb"
| May 8 || 1:00 pm || ESPN+ || at Kansas ||  || Hoglund BallparkLawrence, KS || W19–0 || Campbell(5–1) || Davis(5–5) || — || 527 || 27–14–1 || 10–10–0 || StatsStory
|- bgcolor="#ffbbbb"
| May 9 || 1:00 pm || ESPN+ || at Kansas ||  || Hoglund BallparkLawrence, KS || L7–8 || Ulane(3–0) || Davis(1–3) || — || 383 || 27–15–1 || 10–11–0 || StatsStory
|- bgcolor="#bbffbb"
| May 11 || 7:00 pm || ESPN2 || at Oklahoma* ||  || ONEOK FieldTulsa, OK || W7–3 || Sifrit(1–0) || Ramos(2–1) || — || 5,004 || 28–15–1 || — || StatsStory
|- align="center" bgcolor="bbffbb"
| May 14 || 6:00 pm || ESPN+ || Baylor ||  || O'Brate StadiumStillwater, OK || W8–7(11) || Martin(3–0) || Ashkinos(3–1) || — || 3,304 || 29–15–1 || 11–11–0 || StatsStory
|- align="center" bgcolor="bbffbb"
| May 15 || 6:00 pm || ESPN+ || Baylor ||  || O'Brate StadiumStillwater, OK || W3–1 || Campbell(6–1) || Kettler(4–3) || Cable(1) || 3,639 || 30–15–1 || 12–11–0 || StatsStory
|- align="center" bgcolor="ffbbbb"
| May 16 || 6:00 pm || ESPN+ || Baylor ||  || O'Brate StadiumStillwater, OK || L3–9 || Caley(2–1) || Osmond(2–5) || — || 819 || 30–16–1 || 12–12–0 || StatsStory
|- align="center" bgcolor="bbffbb"
| May 20 || 6:00 pm || ESPN+ || New Orleans* ||  || O'Brate StadiumStillwater, OK || W9–6 || Sifrit(2–0) || Seroski(4–3) || Martin(1) || 6,362 || 31–16–1 || — || StatsStory
|- align="center" bgcolor="bbffbb"
| May 21 || 6:00 pm ||  || New Orleans* ||  || O'Brate StadiumStillwater, OK || W15–1(7) || Stone(2–0) || LeBlanc(1–4) || — || 3,202 || 32–16–1 || — || StatsStory
|- align="center" bgcolor="lightgrey"
| May 22 || 1:00 pm ||  || New Orleans* ||  || O'Brate StadiumStillwater, OK ||  ||  ||  ||  ||  ||  || — || Story
|-

|-
! style="background:#FF6600;color:white;"| Postseason (4–3–0)
|- valign="top"

|- align="center" bgcolor="bbffbb"
| May 26 || 9:00 pm || ESPN+ || vs. (5) Oklahoma || (4) || Bricktown BallparkOklahoma City, OK || W9–5 || Campbell(7–1) || Ruffcorn(4–2) || — || 6,618 || 33–16–1 || 1–0–0 || StatsStory
|- align="center" bgcolor="bbffbb"
| May 28 || 5:00 pm || ESPN+ || vs. (8) West Virginia || (4) || Bricktown BallparkOklahoma City, OK || W12–2(7) || Scott(7–1) || Reed(4–5) || Osmond(1) || 5,239 || 34–16–1 || 2–0–0 || StatsStory
|- align="center" bgcolor="bbffbb"
| May 29 || 1:00 pm || ESPN+ || vs. (1) #2 Texas || (4) || Bricktown BallparkOklahoma City, OK || W5–4 || Davis(2–3) || Nixon(3–3) || Standlee(4) || 5,749 || 35–16–1 || 3–0–0 || StatsStory
|- align="center" bgcolor="ffbbbb"
| May 30 || 5:00 pm || ESPN2 || vs. (2) #15 TCU || (4) || Bricktown BallparkOklahoma City, OK || L7–10 || Wright(3–1) || Bowman(0–1) || — || 7,204 || 35–17–1 || 3–1–0 || StatsStory
|-

|- align="center" bgcolor="ffbbbb"
| June 4 || 3:00 pm || ESPN3 || vs. (3) UC Santa Barbara || (2) #23 || Hi Corbett FieldTucson, AZ || L4–14 || Boone(11–4) || Campbell(7–2) || — || 2,210 || 35–18–1 || 0–1–0 || StatsStory
|- align="center" bgcolor="bbffbb"
| June 5 || 3:00 pm || ESPN3 || vs. (4) Grand Canyon || (2) #23 || Hi Corbett FieldTucson, AZ || W5–4 || Scott(8–1) || McCarville(5–3) || Standlee(5) || 2,336 || 36–18–1 || 1–1–0 || StatsStory
|- align="center" bgcolor="ffbbbb"
| June 6 || 2:00 pm || ESPN3 || vs. (3) UC Santa Barbara || (2) #23 || Hi Corbett FieldTucson, AZ || L3–13 || Lewis(7–4) || Stone(2–1) || — || 2,104 || 36–19–1 || 1–2–0 || StatsStory
|-

| Legend:       = Win       = Loss       = Tie       = Canceled      Bold = Oklahoma State team member
|-
| "*" indicates a non-conference game."#" represents ranking. All rankings from D1Baseball on the date of the contest."()" represents postseason seeding in the Big 12 Tournament or NCAA Regional, respectively.
|-

Rankings

2021 MLB Draft

References

External links 
 Oklahoma State Baseball Schedule

Oklahoma State Cowboys
Oklahoma State Cowboys baseball seasons
Oklahoma State Cowboys baseball